Murray, an electoral district of the Legislative Assembly in the Australian state of New South Wales, has had two incarnations, the first from 1859 to 1999, the second from 2015 to the present.


Members

Election results

Elections in the 2010s

2019

2017 by-election

2015

1999 - 2015

Elections in the 1990s

1995

1991

Elections in the 1980s

1988

1985 by-election

1984

1981

1980 by-election

Elections in the 1970s

1978

1976

1973

1973 by-election

1971

Elections in the 1960s

1968

1965

1962

Elections in the 1950s

1959

1956

1953

1950

Elections in the 1940s

1947

1944

1941

Elections in the 1930s

1938

1935

1932

1930

Elections in the 1920s

1927

1925

1922

1920 appointment
On 9 August 1920 George Beeby resigned to accept appointment as a judge of the Court of Industrial Arbitration and president of the Board of Trade. Between 1920 and 1927 the Legislative Assembly was elected using a form of proportional representation with multi-member seats and a single transferable vote (modified Hare-Clark). There was confusion at the time as to the process to be used to fill the vacancy. In accordance with the practice prior to 1920, the Speaker of the Legislative Assembly issued a writ of election requiring a by-election to be conducted, however the Chief Electoral Officer said he couldn't do so under then law at the time and that a by-election would be contrary to the principle of proportional representation. The vacancy was left unfilled until the Parliament passed the Parliamentary Elections (Casual Vacancies) Act on 10 December 1920, so that casual vacancies were filled by the next unsuccessful candidate on the incumbent member's party list. Matthew Kilpatrick was the unsuccessful  candidate at the 1920 election and took his seat on 15 December 1920.

1920

Elections in the 1910s

1917 by-election

1917

1913

1910

Elections in the 1900s

1907

1904

1901

Elections in the 1890s

1898
This section is an excerpt from 1898 New South Wales colonial election § The Murray

1895
This section is an excerpt from 1895 New South Wales colonial election § The Murray

1894
This section is an excerpt from 1894 New South Wales colonial election § The Murray

1891
This section is an excerpt from 1891 New South Wales colonial election § The Murray

Elections in the 1880s

1889
This section is an excerpt from 1889 New South Wales colonial election § The Murray

1887
This section is an excerpt from 1887 New South Wales colonial election § The Murray

1885
This section is an excerpt from 1885 New South Wales colonial election § The Murray

1882
This section is an excerpt from 1882 New South Wales colonial election § The Murray

1880
This section is an excerpt from 1880 New South Wales colonial election § The Murray

Elections in the 1870s

1877
This section is an excerpt from 1877 New South Wales colonial election § The Murray

1875
This section is an excerpt from 1874-75 New South Wales colonial election § The Murray

1872 by-election

1872
This section is an excerpt from 1872 New South Wales colonial election § The Murray

Elections in the 1860s

1869
This section is an excerpt from 1869-70 New South Wales colonial election § The Murray

1864
This section is an excerpt from 1864–65 New South Wales colonial election § The Murray

1860
This section is an excerpt from 1860 New South Wales colonial election § The Murray

Elections in the 1850s

1859
This section is an excerpt from 1859 New South Wales colonial election § The Murray

Notes

References

New South Wales state electoral results by district